U.S. Highway 2 (US 2) is a  United States Numbered Highway in North Dakota, which runs from the Montana state line east to the Red River at Grand Forks. The route connects the cities of Williston, Minot, and Grand Forks.

Route description

US 2 is an east–west highway that runs through North Dakota's northern tier of larger cities: Williston, Minot, Devils Lake, and Grand Forks.

US 2 intersects two north–south four-lane highways in North Dakota: US 83 at Minot and I-29 at Grand Forks. In addition, it junctions with four other U.S. Highways that, except for shorter stretches that are four lanes, are mostly two-lane highways in North Dakota: US 85 at Williston (which is in the process of being converted into an undivided four-lane south of Williston), US 52 at Minot, US 281 at Churchs Ferry (west of Devils Lake), and US 81 at Grand Forks. All six of these highways provide routes either to the border at Mexico or deep into the southern U.S.

Between Williston and Minot, US 2 provides several high points where one can view graceful and beautiful landscape for many miles in all directions. Between Minot and Grand Forks, US 2 provides an ever-changing mix of agricultural farm and pasture land, native wetlands, and small lakes set on a gently rolling landscape. US 2 also passes near a large lake named Devils Lake near the city with the same name. Throughout the state, the route generally travels east–west, following the route of the Great Northern Railway, which is also used by the Empire Builder. The US 2 route through North Dakota was originally named the Wonderland Trail or the Teddy Roosevelt Trail, after the former U.S. president.

In Rugby, just east of the route's intersection with North Dakota Highway 3 (ND 3), the highway passes the location designated in 1931 as the geographical center of North America. The monument marking the geographic center of the continent had to be relocated in 1971 when US 2 was widened from two to four lanes.

History

North Dakota has been converting sections of US 2 from two lanes to four lanes for many years. The section from Grand Forks to Minot was completed in 1996. The section from Minot to Williston was completed in mid-2008 in a campaign that began a few years ago and was labeled "Across the State in Two Thousand Eight". North Dakota's governor has said that North Dakota will convert the remaining stretch to four lanes if Montana is willing to continue the four-lane project from the border into their state.

Major intersections

See also

References

External links

 North Dakota
2
Transportation in Williams County, North Dakota
Transportation in Mountrail County, North Dakota
Transportation in Ward County, North Dakota
Transportation in McHenry County, North Dakota
Transportation in Pierce County, North Dakota
Transportation in Benson County, North Dakota
Transportation in Ramsey County, North Dakota
Transportation in Nelson County, North Dakota
Transportation in Grand Forks County, North Dakota